Reynaldo Galindo Pohl (Sonsonate, October 21, 1918 – San Salvador, January 4, 2012) was a Salvadoran lawyer and diplomat. He actively participated in the military movement which led to overthrew of Salvador Castaneda Castro in 1948. Galindo Pohl was a member of Revolutionary Government Junta of El Salvador and presided over the Constituent Assembly that drafted the Constitution of 1950. He was the minister of education in the first half of 1950s and after that begun working for United Nations in 1960s.

He was special rapporteur of the Commission of Human Rights on Iran from 1986 to 1995 — after Andres Aguilar (1984-1986) and before Maurice Copithorne (1995-2002).

References

Books 
 
 

1918 births
2012 deaths
Presidents of the Legislative Assembly of El Salvador
United Nations special rapporteurs
Government ministers of El Salvador
20th-century Salvadoran lawyers
Salvadoran officials of the United Nations
20th-century Salvadoran politicians
20th-century diplomats
People from Sonsonate Department